Limnonectes khasianus, commonly known as the corrugated frog, rivulet frog, or sometimes (ambiguously) called "flat-headed frog", is a species of frog in the family Dicroglossidae.
It is found in Brunei, India, Indonesia, Malaysia, Myanmar, Thailand, and possibly Bangladesh and Bhutan. Its natural habitats are subtropical or tropical moist lowland forest, subtropical or tropical moist montane forest, rivers, intermittent rivers, freshwater marshes, and intermittent freshwater marshes.  It is not considered threatened by the IUCN.

References

External links
Amphibian and Reptiles of Peninsular Malaysia - Limnonectes laticeps

khasianus
Frogs of India
Amphibians of Malaysia
Amphibians of Indonesia
Amphibians of Thailand
Taxonomy articles created by Polbot
Amphibians described in 1871